WEC 32: New Mexico was a mixed martial arts (MMA) event held by World Extreme Cagefighting (WEC) that took place on Wednesday, February 13, 2008.  For the first time under Zuffa ownership, the show was held in Rio Rancho, New Mexico and not the usual spot of Las Vegas, Nevada. The event drew an estimated 268,000 viewers on Versus, a record low for the WEC.

Jesse Moreng was originally slated to face the debuting Scott Jorgensen at this event, but withdrew from the bout due to a leg injury and was replaced by WEC newcomer Damacio Page.

Results

See also 
 World Extreme Cagefighting
 List of World Extreme Cagefighting champions
 List of WEC events
 2008 in WEC

External links
Official WEC website

References

World Extreme Cagefighting events
2008 in mixed martial arts
Mixed martial arts in New Mexico
Sports in Rio Rancho, New Mexico
2008 in New Mexico